Lucha Underground was an American professional wrestling promotion founded in 2014 by United Artists Media Group. Partly owned by Lucha Libre AAA Worldwide (AAA), Lucha Underground also refers to its weekly television program, which featured characters portrayed by wrestlers from AAA and the American and Mexican independent circuits. The series originally aired in English on El Rey Network and in Spanish on UniMás.

The series was developed by Mark Burnett and Robert Rodriguez and produced by United Artists, MGM Television, and One Three Media. It premiered on October 29, 2014 and aired until November 7, 2018, consisting of four seasons for a total of 127 episodes. It was set and filmed in Boyle Heights and Downtown Los Angeles, California, while the series later forged creative and production partnerships with other North American promotions.

Lucha Underground received generally positive reviews throughout its run, with praise for its action, characters, and cinematic presentation, with critics noting its departure from professional wrestling tropes of legitimate sporting contests. The series had moderate viewership in its first two seasons, but the third and fourth season saw fluctuations in viewership after it was made available on Netflix prior to the fourth season premiere. The series was eventually cancelled due to budget concerns.

History
In January 2014, it was confirmed Mark Burnett would partner with Robert Rodriguez's El Rey Network to launch a weekly hour-long professional wrestling television series in the second half of the year; it would be affiliated with the Mexican wrestling promotion Lucha Libre AAA Worldwide (AAA). In July, it was tentatively titled Lucha: Uprising, before officially announced as Lucha Underground in August, with AAA wrestlers Blue Demon Jr., Pentagón Jr., Sexy Star, Fénix, and Drago joining the cast. It was to be narrated by Matt Striker and Vampiro and began filming on September 6 in front of a studio audience in Boyle Heights, California.

The series premiered on October 29, 2014, on the El Rey Network where it aired on Wednesdays at 8:00 p.m. E.T., and in Spanish on November 1, 2014, on UniMás where it aired on Saturdays at 4:00 p.m. E.T.

Johnny Mundo won the main event of the pilot episode. Prince Puma was the first Lucha Underground Champion after winning the first Aztec Warfare match on January 7, 2015. On April 22, Ivelisse, Son of Havoc, and Angélico became the first Lucha Underground Trios Champions after winning the inaugural Trios Tournament. The season's two-part finale, Ultima Lucha, which doubled as the promotion's first annual special event, received acclaim. Lucha Underground was subsequently renewed for a second season on September 21, 2015.

The second season began production on November 14, 2015, and premiered on January 27, 2016. Prior to filming, it was leaked the series had been renewed for a third season; El Rey announced the renewal on February 1, 2016. During this period, the Lucha Underground promotion began a collaborative partnership with the International Wrestling Syndicate (IWS), and held its first touring event, Austin Warfare, in Austin, Texas, as part of South by Southwest in 2016. The promotion was also represented by different teams at three editions of the Lucha Libre World Cup, between 2015 and 2017.

On November 10, 2017, it was announced that Lucha Underground had been renewed for a fourth season to premiere in 2018. In February 2018, filming of the series was moved to Downtown Los Angeles. The following month it was announced that the promotion had entered into a working relationship with Impact Wrestling, holding a joint promotional event on Twitch on April 6. The fourth season premiered on June 13, and concluded on November 7, after which producer Eric van Wagenen stated that the series had amassed budget concerns, and would require "a major reboot on a lot of levels" to produce a fifth season.

A fifth season was not produced in 2019, and in a 2020 interview with Chris Van Vliet, Vampiro stated the series was effectively cancelled, and the promotion dissolved.

Roster

Championships

Other accomplishments

Reception
Lucha Underground was well received by critics. John Moore, from ProWrestling.net, praised the show for "[knowing] their identity and [weaving] together an amazing universe". Lucha Underground has also gained praise from media sites like Uproxx, which said Lucha Underground had two of the top ten matches of 2015. In 2015, the show was featured on ESPN's SportsCenter and won SoCal Uncensored's 2015 Southern California promotion of the year award, ending Pro Wrestling Guerrilla's 12 year streak of winning the award.

In comparison to WWE, Sports Illustrated described the promotion as "vastly different", with the show creating a "cinematic approach with supernatural elements and science fiction that also embeds wrestling psychology and storylines".

Broadcasters

Lawsuit by King Cuerno and others
On February 6, 2019, it was reported that Jorge Luis Alcantar, who played King Cuerno, had filed a lawsuit in California against the El Rey Network and the Baba-G production company that made Lucha Underground. The lawsuit claimed that Lucha Underground's contracts "illegally restricted" wrestlers from working in their "lawful profession," by blocking them working for other wrestling companies until their multi-year contracts expired. Production of the series ended in less than 4 years, despite producers signing some original cast member wrestlers to 5-year, exclusive contracts. Alcantar stated that wrestler pay was usually less than $1,000 per appearance, with some wrestling cast members earning only about $4,000 a year from the show. Alcantar's lawyer also revealed that he had filed a class action lawsuit against Lucha Underground on behalf of other wrestlers, claiming their contracts, too, were illegal under California labor law. Other wrestlers Ivelisse Vélez, Joey Ryan, and Melissa Cervantes (who played Kobra Moon) joined the class, seeking to invalidate their contracts. As of March 26, 2019, all lawsuits had been settled in the wrestlers' favor, and they were freed from their Lucha Underground contracts.

Unauthorized revival by MLW
In the fall of 2020, Major League Wrestling (MLW) began incorporating story elements from Lucha Underground into an angle on their weekly television series, MLW Fusion. Talent formerly associated with Lucha Underground were brought into MLW as part of the Azteca Underground stable. The stable would later become the central focus of MLW's mini-series, Fusion: Alpha, which premiered on September 22, 2021.

In June 2021, Dave Meltzer reported that MLW would begin taping content in Los Angeles for a spinoff series that would "resemble Lucha Underground" with plans to film vignettes in the summer and matches in the fall. On August 4, 2021 MLW announced that they had signed a deal to produce a new series centered around Azteca Underground, featuring a different roster from that seen on Fusion. In an update on the November 1, 2021 episode of Wrestling Observer Radio, Meltzer reported that tapings for the series were cancelled because MLW was unable to secure a TV deal. 

On December 3, 2021, MLW held a MLW Azteca event, in collaboration with The Crash Lucha Libre; matches from which where shown on the MLW Azteca mini-series. MLW Azteca premiered on YouTube on January 6, 2022 and concluded with its fifth episode on February 3, 2022. On April 1, 2022, MLW held an Azteca Underground event in Dallas, Texas. 

Elements of Lucha Underground continue to appear on MLW programming, with the former Dario Cueto, Cesar Duran, serving as MLW matchmaker and other former Lucha Underground wrestlers appearing for the promotion.

References

External links
 Official website
 MGM webpage for Lucha Underground

 
Lucha Libre AAA Worldwide
2014 American television series debuts
2018 American television series endings
Professional wrestling in Los Angeles
Independent professional wrestling promotions based in California
Television series by MGM Television
Defunct brands